The 2005 1000 km of Silverstone was the third round of the 2005 Le Mans Series season and held at Silverstone Circuit, United Kingdom.  It was run on August 13, 2005.

Official results

Class winners in bold.  Cars failing to complete 70% of winner's distance marked as Not Classified (NC).

Statistics
 Pole Position - #7 Creation Autosportif - 1:34.562
 Fastest Lap - #4 Audi PlayStation Team Oreca - 1:53.635
 Average Speed - 132.626 km/h

External links
 World Sports Racing Prototypes - 2005 1000 km of Silverstone results

S
6 Hours of Silverstone
Silverstone